Hauraki District Council is the territorial authority for the Hauraki District of New Zealand.

The council consists of the mayor of Hauraki  and 13 ward councillors.

Composition

Councillors

 Mayor 
 Paeroa Ward: Deputy Mayor Paul Milner, Carole Daley, Jo Tilsley, Rino Wilkinson
 Plains Ward: Ray Broad, Phillip Buckthought, Rodney Garrett, Ross Harris
 Waihi Ward: Paul Anderson, Brian Gentil, Sara Howell, Duncan Smeaton, Anne Marie Spicer

History

The council was established in 1989, from the merger of Waihi Borough Council (established in 1902), Paeroa Borough Council (established in 1915), and Hauraki Plains County Council (established in 1920).

References

External links

 Official website

Hauraki District
Politics of Waikato
Territorial authorities of New Zealand